Dasht-e Gur (also Romanized as Dasht-e Gūr; also known as Dasht-e Kowr and Dasht-e Kūr) is a village in Eshkanan Rural District, Eshkanan District, Lamerd County, Fars Province, Iran. At the 2006 census, its population was 50, in 8 families.

References 

Populated places in Lamerd County